Penyrheol may refer to:

Penyrheol, Caerphilly
Penyrheol, Pontypool
Penyrheol, Swansea
Penyrheol (Swansea electoral ward)
Penyrheol, an area of Town, Merthyr Tydfil